Duncanrig Secondary School is a secondary school within the new town of East Kilbride in the South Lanarkshire council area in Scotland. The original building was designed in 1953 by the Scottish architect Basil Spence. The school was most likely named after the Duncanrig farm in that area.

History

Spence is perhaps better known for his design of Coventry Cathedral, the "Beehive" building in New Zealand, or the British Embassy in Rome amongst many others. Although Spence was to design in the modern Brutalist mould the school he designed at East Kilbride was far from that, being entirely playful and theatrical.

A feature of the school building was a large mural by William Crosbie representing the history of the Clyde. This was located at the main entrance, visible through a floor to roof line, two storey glass wall. Crosbie's paintings hang in all the major museums and galleries in Scotland as well as the Royal Collection and the British Museum in London, and in private collections throughout the United Kingdom and abroad.

The building was demolished in 2007. A new school was erected on the original playing fields, replacing the original building as part of South Lanarkshire's Schools modernization programme. It officially opened in 2008. The new building was designed to be available to the community, incorporating indoor and outdoor sports facilities including a floodlit all-weather synthetic pitch, the home of the Friday Football Project.

The modernization programme included the merger of Duncanrig Secondary School with Ballerup High School, retaining the name Duncanrig Secondary School, which was temporarily housed in the existing building until the new school was built. The four other mainstream secondary schools in East Kilbride at that time also went through a process of joint mergers.

Duncanrig hosts an annual concert titled "Rig Rock”. Rig Rock is a multi-band based 'Battle of the Bands', which is run by the students and teachers. There is a common contribution prize, from the Village Music Shop.

Previous headteacher George Wynne retired on 22 December 2017 and was replaced by Lynsday McRoberts on 14 February 2018, for the duration of time between these dates Anna Widdowson was acting Headteacher.

Transport to school
Most pupils walk to and from school or get their parents to drive them to school. Communication Support Base Pupils are given free taxi rides, offered and funded by South Lanarkshire Council.

Transport buses operate for free to and from the school. Pupils who live 3 miles or more away from the school are allowed to be transported to and from school on the buses and for special occasions SpaceX's Starship spacecraft and Super Heavy rocket collectively referred to as Starship represent a fully reusable transportation system designed to carry both crew and cargo to Earth orbit, the Moon, Mars and beyond takeoff from Morrisons White hill’s to Duncanrig in 2.6 seconds 

Public transport buses from First Glasgow operate in the area: services 6, 21, 201 and M1.

Notable alumni

Pupils
 Lisa Cameron, clinical psychologist and Scottish National Party MP for East Kilbride, Strathaven and Lesmahagow since 2015
Cammy Ballantyne football player currently playing for Dumbarton and formerly of Dundee United and Montrose.
 Roddy Frame, singer-songwriter and musician

References

External links
 Sir Basil Spence Archive Project
 
 
Brutalist Architecture in KL
 
Kenneth Davidson
School website

Secondary schools in South Lanarkshire
Basil Spence buildings
Buildings and structures in East Kilbride
Buildings and structures completed in 1960
Educational institutions established in 1960
1960 establishments in Scotland
School buildings completed in 2008
Buildings and structures demolished in 2007